Radonić may refer to:

Radonić (surname)
, a village in the city of Drniš, Croatia
, a village in the city of Šibenik, Croatia

See also
Radonjić (disambiguation)